The Tavern League of Wisconsin (TLW) is a trade association of alcoholic beverage retailers in the state of Wisconsin. The League was created in 1935, two years after the end of Prohibition, and today has 5,000 members. The League is headquartered in Fitchburg, Wisconsin.

The TLW lobbies for member interests at the state and federal level, and supports members in complying with legal issues facing their businesses. Issues include opposition to increases in alcohol and cigarette taxes and licensing laws seen as onerous, and opposition to restrictions on gambling machines. The TLW supports programs that aim to combat drunk driving by providing rides to and from bars. At the same time, the TLW has condemned campaigns against binge drinking in Wisconsin as an attempt to "demonize" people who drink casually to relax. In 2005, lobbyists with the TLW were investigated by the State Ethics Board; the investigation was launched after State Senator Russell Decker was pulled over for drunk driving shortly after leaving an all-you-can-drink event for lawmakers hosted by the TLW.

The TLW has focused especially on opposing smoking bans in drinking establishments. When a smoking ban law was proposed in 2008, the TLW worked with state senate majority leader Decker to insert provisions requiring that the ban would not take effect until July 5, 2010, giving members time to adapt, and preventing municipalities from passing laws that would have the same effect in the grace period. An editorial in the Appleton Post-Crescent stated that this "derailed" the bill. Previously, the TLW had received money and lobbying help from R.J. Reynolds Tobacco Company to fight smoking ban legislation in Wisconsin. Researchers from the University of Wisconsin–Madison accused the TLW of working in concert with the tobacco industry and other trade groups to undermine Wisconsin's anti-smoking efforts, particularly its attempts to restrict the sale of cigarettes to minors. The study's conclusions were disputed by Philip Morris and by other members of the coalition.

In recent years, League lobbyists have actively campaigned to lower the drinking age in the state.

See also
 Alcohol laws of Wisconsin
 Dry county
 List of dry communities by U.S. state#Wisconsin

References

External links
 Tavern League of Wisconsin

Trade associations based in the United States
Lobbying organizations in the United States
Politics of Wisconsin
Organizations based in Madison, Wisconsin
1935 establishments in Wisconsin